Rosefield is an unincorporated community within the Rural Municipality of Val Marie No. 17, Saskatchewan, Canada. The community is located about 25 km south of Val Marie bordering Grasslands National Park.  Rosefield - as it is known to the people, is home to individuals, couples and families who ranch, farm or work in tourism and other business operations.

Demographics

In 2006, Rosefield had a population of 16 living in 9 dwellings, a 30% increase from 2001.

See also

 List of communities in Saskatchewan

References

Val Marie No. 17, Saskatchewan
Unincorporated communities in Saskatchewan
Division No. 4, Saskatchewan